Pascal Touron (born 22 May 1973 in Arcachon) is a French rower. He won one of his first international races in 1989 in the GB vs France Under 16 Match. He has won two Olympic medals: a bronze medal in the Men's Lightweight Double Sculls in 2000 and a silver in the same event in 2004.

References 
 
 

1973 births
Living people
French male rowers
Rowers at the 2000 Summer Olympics
Rowers at the 2004 Summer Olympics
Olympic silver medalists for France
Olympic bronze medalists for France
Olympic rowers of France
Olympic medalists in rowing
World Rowing Championships medalists for France
Medalists at the 2004 Summer Olympics
Medalists at the 2000 Summer Olympics
21st-century French people